Agbede is a Muslim town in the Northern part of Edo State. It has been in existence since the 13th century. It is the door way into the North of the State.

Geography 
The town has several villages also referred to as Ayuele clans. It includes; Jagbe, Odigie, Egono, Ubiane, Ughiole and Egho. Agbede is bordered by Ewu, Idoa from the South and Auchi to the North. The main stay of the community is farming. Agbedes are famous for producing the unique staple cereal crop called Agbede Rice. The inhabitants of this geography also farm yam & cassava. They are blessed with the most arable flat land surface for agricultural production.

In terms of the weather, there are majorly two seasons; raining and dry season accompanied by harmattan.

Naming of Agbede 
It is said Agbedes were the original makers of the artifacts in Benin before their exodus into the northern part of the geography called Edo State.

It is also said that the first Agbedes were originally unemes. Another school of thought holds that Agbedes and Unemes were blessed with creativity in approaching arts.

The Agbede people can be called Agbedes (Anglicization). But, they call themselves in their language, Igbede.

Precolonial Agbede 
Agbede is an ancient community. In precolonial times, it was the area through which iron was smelted for the Benin Empire warriors. The Agbedes and unemes were the Benin empire smelters. There is a school of thought that says Unemes are Agbede Ayuele and Agbedes are Unemes. The only difference is their geographical spread and linguistical alteration. Agbedes/Unemes were also blacksmiths for the Nupes.

Benin empire

 The Agbede country was the kukuruku (Edo north) administrative headquarters of Benin Empire.

In fact, jacob Egharevba in his classics succinctly put it clearly"The headquarter of the colony or province of the old Benin empire in Kukuruku was Agbede."

 Agbede was also the administrative headquarters of the Nupe empire in Kukuruku/otoesan.
 Agbede Ayuele country's king, Oba Abdullahi (successor of Oba Momodu) served as the Head of kukuruku until he handed over to Otaru Momoh and he offered prayers for him.

Relationship with empires/kingdom 
 Agbede established trade, educational and Islamic relationship with the following enviable historical empires;

1. Illorin Emirate

2. Kano Emirate

3. Kogi kingdom (probably igbira)

4. Benin Empire

5. Bida Emirate of Nupe Empire

Agbede Ayuele contribution to Islamic education 
From the onset, Agbede concentrated fully on establishing itself as a center for traditional Islamic Education & thoughts.

The first Muslim king of Agbede strong bond with the etsu Nupe and Bida Emirate enabled him to always accompany himself with Muslim scholars whenever he is returning from Bida. They first settle at Agbede and are later sent to places in Kukuruku to enable Islamic learning. Shaykh Bawa amongst others was an example. He was sent to Auchi to enable Islamic learning. He became the chief Imam.

Agbede have always sent Scholars of Islam of Agbede or northern origin to aid Islamic understanding in different areas of Edo.

Agbede Kings were also reported to have directly asked for scholars from a kingdom in Kogi (probably igbira) because of their relationship, it was easy for a scholar to be sent down to Agbede.

Agbede prided itself as the center of learning where Muslims and new Muslims come in groups around Afenmai (Kukuruku) and Esan to study Islam. Since the foundation for Islamic scholarship was well established and all encompassing, the sent Muslims studied to their fill and went back to become Imams and Mallams of their various towns and villages. They not only aided learning, they spurred further Islamization of their societies.

References 

Populated places in Edo State